The Isle of Man Tourist Trophy races have a long (hundred-year plus) history thanks in part to the demanding 37 mile high-speed track plus Mountain Course (with a seemingly never-ending series of bends, bumps, jumps, stone walls, manhole covers and telegraph poles) which - needless to say - requires high levels of skill and concentration. Held annually in the last week of May for practice and the first week of June for racing week with many supporting attractions, gatherings and other events taking place.

For many years regarded as the most prestigious and oldest motorcycle race in the world, it has been reported as the most dangerous motorcycle road-race in the world. (From 1949–1976 the Isle of Man Tourist Trophy was part of the FIM Motorcycle Grand Prix World Championship prior to transfer to UK mainland over safety concerns.)

1958 Isle of Man Junior TT 350cc final standings
7 Laps (264.11 Miles) Mountain Course.

1958 Isle of Man Lightweight TT 250cc final standings
10 Laps (107.90 miles) Clypse Course.

1958 Isle of Man Lightweight TT 125cc final standings
10 Laps (107.90 miles) Clypse Course.

1958 Sidecar TT final standings
10 Laps (107.90 miles) Clypse Course.

1958 Isle of Man Senior TT 500cc final standings
Friday 18 June 1958  –  7 Laps (274.11 miles) Mountain Course.

References

External links
 Detailed race results
 Isle of Man TT winners
 Mountain Course map

Isle of Man Tt
Tourist Trophy
Isle of Man TT
Isle of Man TT